Guozhen Lu (born 1963) is a professor of mathematics at the University of Connecticut. He is known for his contributions to harmonic analysis, geometric analysis, and partial differential equations.

Education and career

Lu graduated from Zhejiang University in Hangzhou, China in 1983 and earned his Ph.D. from Rutgers University in 1991. He was a Bateman Research Instructor in the Department of Mathematics at the California Institute of Technology from 1991 to 1993, and an assistant professor in the Department of Mathematics and Statistics at Wright State University from 1993 to 1997 and an associate professor of the same department from 1997 to 2000 before he moved to Wayne State University. He became a professor of mathematics at Wayne State University in 2002. He joined the University of Connecticut in 2016 as a professor. Lu has co-organized many international conferences, including the series of the East Asian Conference in Harmonic Analysis and Applications, which is held annually, rotating between China, Japan, and Korea.

Awards and honors

In 2015, Lu was awarded a Simons Fellowship in Mathematics from the Simons Foundation. In 2017, he was elected to the 2018 class of Fellows of the American Mathematical Society, "for contributions to harmonic analysis and partial differential equations, and for service to the mathematical community."

Editorial board service

Lu has served as an editor of numerous mathematical research journals including
Nonlinear Analysis, Advanced Nonlinear Studies, Acta Mathematica Sinica (English Series).

Community service

Lu has served as a member of the Michigan governor's advisory council on Asian Pacific American Affairs from 2005 to 2009, and as a commissioner of Michigan Asian Pacific American Affairs Commission from 2009 to 2016.

References

External links
 The homepage of Guozhen Lu
 Professor of Mathematics Named American Mathematical Society Fellow, UConn Today

Living people
1963 births
Zhejiang University alumni
Hangzhou University alumni
Rutgers University alumni
California Institute of Technology faculty
Wright State University faculty
Wayne State University faculty
University of Connecticut faculty
Fellows of the American Mathematical Society
20th-century American mathematicians
21st-century American mathematicians